Filip Pankarićan (born 28 March 1993) is a Serbian football midfielder who currently plays for Maltese Premier League club Gudja United.

Club career
Born in Zrenjanin, Filip started his career playing for local club Banat Zrenjanin. Later he played for Senta, Cement Beočin and ČSK Čelarevo.

ŠKF Sereď
Pankarićan made his Fortuna Liga debut for ŠKF Sereď against Železiarne Podbrezová on 25 August 2018. He started the match in the starting-XI and was replaced by Rudolf Bilas after about 80 minutes.

References

External links
 
 
 Futbalnet profile 

1993 births
Living people
Sportspeople from Zrenjanin
Serbian footballers
Serbian expatriate footballers
Association football midfielders
FK Senta players
FK Cement Beočin players
FK ČSK Čelarevo players
FK Slovan Duslo Šaľa players
MFK Skalica players
ŠKF Sereď players
Gudja United F.C. players
Slovak Super Liga players
Maltese Premier League players
2. Liga (Slovakia) players
3. Liga (Slovakia) players
Expatriate footballers in Slovakia
Serbian expatriate sportspeople in Slovakia